Boris Mikhailovich Kloss (born 19 December 1932) is a Russian historian, source critic, specialist in palaeography and archeography, a university professor, Doctor of History (1989); head of the History of Religion and Church Centre, Honorary Doctor of the European University (2003), member of the International Association of the Old Slavic Studies (1992). He studied under Andrey Kolmogorov, Lev Cherepnin, Militsa Nechkina.

Kloss was born in Moscow in the family of a military man. He graduated from the Mechanics and Mathematics Faculty of the Moscow State University in 1956. In 1958 he started working for the USSR Institute of Automatics. Since 1971 he worked at the USSR Institute of History under the Russian Academy of Sciences. He completed the thesis in the topic The Nikon Chronicle and the Russian Chronicles of the 16th-17th centuries.  In 1980-1990 he simultaneously taught at the Moscow State University, the Moscow Institute of Physics and Technology and Russian State University for the Humanities. He became a renowned specialist in Kievan Rus' literature, specifically in Russian hagiography. He lectured in various universities of the United States, Poland, Norway, Russia.

Publications 
 The Nikon Chronicle and the Russian Chronicles of the 16th-17th centuries, 1980
 Life of St. Sergius of Radonezh, 1998
 On the Russian Hagiography of the 14th-16th centuries, 2001
 On the Origin of the name of Russia, 2012
 Chernyshevsky at the Head of Revolutionaries of 1861, 1981
 Editor of the modern edition of the Complete Collection of Russian Chronicles.

References 

1932 births
20th-century Russian historians
Academic staff of the Moscow Institute of Physics and Technology
Moscow State University alumni
Soviet historians
Russian palaeographers
Academic staff of Moscow State University
Living people